Refoundation in Movement was a faction within the Communist Refoundation Party in Italy.

In April 2008, following the severe defeat of the party in the 2008 general election, a group of former , composed basically of former members of Proletarian Democracy and led by Paolo Ferrero and Giovanni Russo Spena, criticized The Left – The Rainbow alliance and the political line of Fausto Bertinotti. In that occasion they allied with the other minority factions in order to force Secretary Franco Giordano to resign.

The group named "Refoundation in Movement" joined forces with Being Communists, the largest minority faction in the 2005 national congress with 26.3%, and obtained the 40.1% of the vote of party members in local congresses. In the 24–27 July 2008 congress Paolo Ferrero was elected party secretary with the support of all the minority factions, notably including The Ernesto and some Trotskyist groups.

External links 
 Official website

Communist Refoundation Party factions